Christian Plaziat (born 28 October 1963 in Lyon) is a retired French decathlete. During his career he won the European Championships, the European Indoor Championships and the World Indoor Championships.

Achievements

See also
Men's heptathlon world record progression

External links

1963 births
Living people
French decathletes
Athletes (track and field) at the 1988 Summer Olympics
Athletes (track and field) at the 1992 Summer Olympics
Athletes (track and field) at the 1996 Summer Olympics
Olympic athletes of France
Athletes from Lyon
European Athletics Championships medalists
World Athletics Indoor Championships winners